Albania competed at the 2016 Summer Olympics in Rio de Janeiro, Brazil, from 5 to 21 August 2016. This was the nation's eighth appearance at the Olympics after its debut in 1972. The National Olympic Committee of Albania sent a total of six athletes to the Games, three per gender, who competed in three sports (athletics, swimming, and weightlifting).

Notable athletes in the Albanian roster featured weightlifter and London 2012 Olympian Briken Calja, swimmer Sidni Hoxha, who competed at his third Olympics in the sprint freestyle, and middle-distance runner Luiza Gega, who was selected to carry the nation's flag in the opening ceremony. Albania has yet to win its first Olympic medal.

Athletics
 
Albanian athletes achieved qualifying standards in the following athletics events (up to a maximum of 3 athletes in each event):

Track & road events

Field events

Swimming
 
Albania received a Universality invitation from FINA to send two swimmers (one male and one female) to the Olympics.

Weightlifting

Albania qualified one male weightlifter for the Olympics by virtue of his top 15 individual finish, among those who had not secured any quota places through the World or European Championships, in the IWF World Rankings as of 20 June 2016. The place was awarded to London 2012 Olympian Briken Calja in the men's lightweight division (69 kg).

Meanwhile, an unused women's Olympic spot was awarded to the Albanian team by IWF, as a result of Russia's complete ban from the Games due to the "multiple positive cases" of doping. This place was given to Evagjelia Veli.

References

External links 
 

Olympics
2016
Nations at the 2016 Summer Olympics